The 2021–22 FD Senior Division was the top-tier football season of Delhi Football League. The season started on October 9, 2021, and commenced on January 7, 2022. Previously, a short format tournament was held for the I-League Qualifiers.

Format
18 teams are divided in two groups, comprising 10 teams in group A and 8 teams in group B. Group stage matches will be played in robin round basis. Five teams from each group will qualify for the inaugural Delhi Premier League. 

Premier League will be played in round robin format. 10 teams will play each other once and league leader will be adjudged the winner. Bottom teams could be relegated to lower division.

Teams 

18 teams took part in the 2021 regular edition of the league:

Group A
Indian Air Force FC
Royal Rangers FC
Youngmen SC
City FC
Tarun Sangha FC
Uttarakhand FC
National United SC
Ahbab FC
Jaguar FC
Friends United FC

Group B
Delhi FC
Garhwal FC
Delhi United FC
Hindustan FC
Shastri FC
Rangers SC
Sudeva Delhi FC
Garhwal Diamond FC

Foreign players

Standings

Group stage

Group A

Group B

Premier League

See also
2021–22 season in state football leagues of India
2021–22 Punjab State Super Football League
2022 Himachal Football League

References

Football in Delhi
3
2021–22 in Indian football